Rinky Dink may refer to:

 "Rinky Dink" (instrumental), a 1962 hit co-written and performed by Dave "Baby" Cortez
 Rinky Dink (sound system), a mobile musical sound system powered by two bicycles and solar panels
 The Rinky Dinks, the credited (fictitious) performers, due to legal issues, of the song "Early in the Morning" (Bobby Darin song)